Raúl Alexander Acha Alemán (born January 25, 1985) is a Mexican singer-songwriter.

Life

The son of Mexican pop singer Emmanuel, Alexander Acha is also a pianist and a Berklee College of Music alumnus. He was born to an American mother, Madison Anne Johnson, who taught Alexander piano and other instruments. 

He was raised as a Roman Catholic and still attends mass. His debut album Voy (2008) reached gold status in his native country, with Te Amo being his first single. On November 5, 2009, he won the Latin Grammy for Best New Artist.

Discography

Albums 

 Voy (2008)
 La vida es... (2011)
 Claroscuro (2014)
 Luz (2018)
 Las Italianas (2022)

References

External links
Official Website

1985 births
Living people
Mexican male singer-songwriters
Mexican singer-songwriters
Mexican composers
Mexican male composers
Mexican pianists
Latin Grammy Award for Best New Artist
Singers from Mexico City
Mexican Roman Catholics
Mexican people of Basque descent
Mexican people of Spanish descent
Berklee College of Music alumni
Warner Music Latina artists
Male classical pianists
21st-century Mexican singers
21st-century classical pianists
21st-century Mexican male singers